San Vicente Mountain Park is a former Nike Missile Radar/Control Site in Southern California. The site is located on land owned by the 
city of Los Angeles above the Encino Reservoir along the unpaved portion of Mulholland Drive west of the 405 freeway.

See also
 List of Nike missile sites

References

Santa Monica Mountains
U.S. Army Nike sites